The 15715 / 15716 Garib Nawaj Express is an express passenger train connecting the Indian cities of Kishanganj and Ajmer.

Service
This is a direct train between Kishanganj and Ajmer. This is train connects the Eastern and Northern parts of India covering Bihar, Uttar Pradesh and Rajasthan.

See also 
 Ajmer Junction railway station
 Kishanganj railway station
 New Jalpaiguri - Sitamarhi Weekly Express
 Paharia Express
 Ajmer - Bangalore City Garib Nawaz Express

References

Transport in Ajmer
Named passenger trains of India
Rail transport in Uttar Pradesh
Rail transport in Bihar
Rail transport in Haryana
Rail transport in Rajasthan
Rail transport in Delhi
Rail transport in West Bengal